The year 2008 in art involves various significant events.

Events
A Fernand Léger painting Woman and Child (1921), which was at first on loan for an exhibit from the Davis Museum at Wellesley College in Wellesley, Massachusetts to the Oklahoma City Museum of Art while the Davis was closed for renovations, is later returned and then stored in a crate at Wellesley, but disappears in the intervening period; the work has not been seen since.
May – Police seize photographs by Bill Henson from an upcoming exhibition at the Roslyn Oxley9 Gallery in Sydney, Australia, as potentially constituting child pornography.

Exhibitions
 20 February until 18 May – National Gallery, Pompeo Batoni
4 July until 14 September  – "Robert Indiana a Milano"  at the Padiglione d’Arte Contemporanea (Pavilion of Contemporary Art) in Milan, Italy

Works

Mel Bochner – BLAH! BLAH! BLAH! (seminal work in the series)
 Christine Bourdette – Cairns, installation in Portland, Oregon
 Gabriel Koren – Prudence Crandall with Student in the Connecticut State Capitol in Hartford, Connecticut
Allison Saar - Harriet Tubman Memorial in Harlem, New York City (sculpture)
Cindy Sherman – Untitled (chromogenic photographic print)
 Stan's Cafe – Of All The People In All The World, installation and performance
La Danse de la fontaine émergente, fountain in Paris designed by Chen Zhen and completed by his widow Xu Min
Monumento al perro callejero in Mexico City

Awards
 Archibald Prize – Del Kathryn Barton for "You are what is most beautiful about me, a self portrait with Kell and Arella
 Artes Mundi Prize – N. S. Harsha
 Caldecott Medal – Brian Selznick, The Invention of Hugo Cabret
 Hugo Boss Prize – Emily Jacir
 John Moores Painting Prize – Peter McDonald for "Fontana"
 Doug Moran National Portrait Prize – Fiona Lowry
 Rolf Schock Prize in Visual Arts – Mona Hatoum
 Turner Prize nominees – Runa Islam, Mark Leckey, Goshka Macuga and Cathy Wilkes.

Deaths

January to March
1 January – Harold Corsini, American photographer and educator (born 1919)
3 January – Joan Gillchrest, 89, British painter.
26 January – Viktor Schreckengost, American industrial designer (born 1906)
9 February - Dorothy Podber, American performance artist (b.1932)
2 February – Roger Testu, French cartoonist (b.1913).
3 March – William Brice, American painter and teacher (b.1921).
11 March – Dave Stevens, American illustrator and comics artist (b.1955).
19 March – Hugo Claus, Belgian novelist, poet, playwright, painter and film director (b.1929).
28 March – Michael Podro, English art historian (b.1931).
29 March
Angus Fairhurst, Young British Artist, installation, photography and video artist (b.1966).
Josef Mikl, Austrian abstract painter (b.1929).

April to June
3 April – Vladimír Preclík, Czech writer and sculptor (b.1929).
6 April – John Plumb, English painter (b.1927).
9 April – Burt Glinn, American photographer (b.1925).
14 April – Ollie Johnston, American animator (b.1912).
16 April – Joseph Solman, American painter (b.1909).
23 April – Paul Wonner, American painter (b.1920).
25 April – Enrico Donati, Italian-born American Surrealist painter and sculptor (b.1909).
10 May – Herbert Albert, 82, British painter and etcher.
12 May – Robert Rauschenberg, American artist (b.1925).
15 May
Will Elder, American illustrator and comic book artist (b.1921).
Flip Schulke, American photojournalist (b.1930).
18 May – Pietro Cascella, Italian painter and sculptor (b.1921).
21 May – Bartolomeu Cid dos Santos, Portuguese artist and professor (b.1931).
23 May – Cornell Capa, Hungarian-American photographer and photo curator (b.1918).
28 May – Beryl Cook, English painter (b.1926).
1 June 
Alton Kelley, American poster and album artist (b.1940).
Yves Saint Laurent, French fashion designer (b.1936).
18 June – Tasha Tudor, American illustrator and author of children's books (b.1915).

July to December
7 July 
Bruce Conner, American artist in film, drawing, sculpture, painting, collage and photography (b.1933).
Fred Yates, English artist (b.1922).
19 July – Dave Pearson, English painter (b.1937).
1 August – Pauline Baynes, English book illustrator (b.1922).
12 August – Michael Baxandall, Welsh art historian (b.1933).
18 August – Manny Farber, American painter and film critic (b.1917).
23 August – John Russell, British American art critic (b.1919).
3 September – Derek Davis, English painter and potter (b.1926).
4 September – Alain Jacquet, French artist (b.1939).
12 September – Simon Hantaï, Hungarian abstract artist (b.1922).
1 October – Boris Efimov, Russian cartoonist and propaganda artist (b.1900).
7 October – Miles Richmond, English painter (b.1922).
11 October – William Claxton, American photographer (b.1927)
14 October – Ray Lowry, English cartoonist and illustrator (b.1944).
18 October – Gwyther Irwin, English abstract artist (b.1931).
15 November – Grace Hartigan, American Abstract Expressionist painter, (b.1922)
16 November – Jan Krugier, Polish born Swiss art dealer (born 1928.
17 November – Guy Peellaert, Belgian artist, painter, illustrator, comic artist and photographer (born 1934)
17 December – Willoughby Sharp, American author, curator, critic (b.1936)
27 December – Robert Graham, Mexican-American sculptor (b.1938).
29 December – Vladislav Lalicki, Serbian painter (born 1935).

References

 
 
2000s in art
Years of the 21st century in art